Dobroslava is a village and municipality in Svidník District in the Prešov Region of north-eastern Slovakia.

History
In historical records the village was first mentioned in 1600. The village is primarily inhabited by Rusyns.  There was heavy fighting in and around the village as part of the Battle of the Dukla Pass in October 1944.

Geography
The municipality lies at an altitude of 335 metres and covers an area of 5.577 km². It has a population of about 139 people.

Genealogical resources
The records for genealogical research are available at the state archive "Statny Archiv in Presov, Slovakia".

 Greek Catholic church records (births/marriages/deaths): 1860-1895 (parish B)

See also 

 Dobrosława, a Slavic name
 List of municipalities and towns in Slovakia

References

External links
 
https://web.archive.org/web/20071116010355/http://www.statistics.sk/mosmis/eng/run.html
Surnames of living people in Dobroslava

Villages and municipalities in Svidník District
Šariš